Tom Burgess (born March 6, 1964) is a former all-star quarterback in the Canadian Football League (CFL).

Burgess was a graduate of Colgate University, playing from 1982 to 1985, and was inducted into the Colgate University Athletic Hall of Honor in 1986. As a senior on the 1985 squad, he was named honorable mention Associated Press All-American after setting 14 school records in passing and total offense. He finished ninth in the nation in total offense with 266.1 yards per game. Burgess also received Colgate's Andy Kerr Trophy, given annually to the squad's most valuable offensive player. He threw for a school-record 2,565 yards in 1985 and gained a school-record 2,927 yards of total offense.

He moved to Canada in 1986, and played for the Ottawa Rough Riders, the Saskatchewan Roughriders and the Winnipeg Blue Bombers. He was instrumental in the Roughriders playoff run for their 1989 Grey Cup victory and quarterbacked the Blue Bombers to a Grey Cup win in 1990. Burgess was named the Grey Cup's Most Valuable Player on Offence of the 78th Grey Cup.

Tom Burgess was part of a quarterback tandem in Saskatchewan with Kent Austin. Burgess defeated the 16-2 Edmonton Eskimos in the 1989 CFL Western Final replacing an injured Austin who would return to start and win the 1989 Grey Cup. Both quarterbacks were capable starters and Burgess requested a trade in the off-season to pursue a full-time starting opportunity, getting that chance with the Blue Bombers. Burgess was a full-time starter for the next five seasons. He won a Grey Cup starting with the Winnipeg Blue Bombers in 1990, and became an East Division All-Star selection. He enjoyed a 5,000 yard, 30 TD passing season with Ottawa.

He spent his final two seasons as a Roughrider and was inducted into the Saskatchewan Roughrider Plaza of Honor in 2009.

References

1964 births
Living people
American football quarterbacks
Canadian football quarterbacks
American players of Canadian football
Colgate Raiders football players
Ottawa Rough Riders players
Saskatchewan Roughriders players
Winnipeg Blue Bombers players
People from Newark, New York
Players of American football from New York (state)